Quindarious Deavundre "Tookie" Brown (born November 22, 1995) is an American professional basketball player who last played for the Lakeland Magic of the NBA G League. He played college basketball for the Georgia Southern University and was named the 2019 Sun Belt Conference Player of the Year.

College career
Brown went to Georgia Southern from Morgan County High School in Madison, Georgia, where he scored over 3,000 points and led the school to its first state title. He originally committed to Mississippi State, but withdrew his commitment when the Bulldogs experienced a coaching change. He immediately made an impact for the Eagles, averaging 17.8 points, 3.4 assists and 3.2 rebounds, earning Sun Belt Conference Freshman of the Year honors and a spot on the All-Sun Belt first team. Brown declared for the 2018 NBA draft, later opting to return for his senior season.

Brown would go on to have perhaps the most decorated career in Georgia Southern program history. He is the first player to receive first-team All-Sun Belt Conference honors four times, and became the Eagles' all-time leading Division I scorer early in his senior season. On January 17, 2019, Brown scored his 2,000th career point. At the close of his senior year, Brown became the first Eagle to be named Sun Belt Player of the Year.

Professional career
After going undrafted in the 2019 NBA draft, Brown signed his first professional contract with Limburg United of the Belgian Pro Basketball League. He opted to return to the United States after the season was cancelled on March 13, 2020.

On December 20, 2020, he has signed with Wilki Morskie Szczecin of the PLK.

On August 1, 2021, he has signed with Basketball Löwen Braunschweig of the German Pro Basketball League.

Lakeland Magic (2023)
On January 1, 2023, Brown was acquired by the Lakeland Magic. Brown was waived later that same day.

References

External links
Georgia Southern Eagles bio
College stats @ basketball-reference.com

1995 births
Living people
American expatriate basketball people in Belgium
American men's basketball players
Basketball Löwen Braunschweig players
Basketball players from Augusta, Georgia
Georgia Southern Eagles men's basketball players
Limburg United players
Shooting guards